

This is a list of arts and cultural festivals regularly taking place in Edinburgh, Scotland.

The city has become known for its festivals since the establishment in 1947 of the Edinburgh International Festival and the Edinburgh Festival Fringe which runs alongside it. The latter is the largest event of its kind in the world.

The term Edinburgh Festival is commonly used, but there is no single festival; the various festivals are put on by separate, unrelated organisations. However they are widely regarded as part of the same event, particularly the various festivals that take place simultaneously in August each year. The term Edinburgh Festival is often used to refer more specifically to the Fringe, being the largest of the festivals; or sometimes to the International Festival, being the original "official" arts festival. Within the industry, people refer to all the festivals collectively as the Edinburgh Festivals (plural).

The festivals 

Listed in chronological order by 2018 start date, with year of foundation in brackets

April
 Dead by Dawn (1993)
 Edinburgh International Science Festival (1988)

Easter time
 Ceilidh Culture (1951)

May
 Edinburgh International Children's Festival (formerly the Imaginate Festival) (1990)

June
 Leith Festival (1907)
 Leith Jazz and Blues Festival
 Edinburgh International Film Festival (1947) 
 Edinburgh Annuale (2004)

July
 Edinburgh International Magic Festival (2010)
 Edinburgh Jazz and Blues Festival (1978)

August
 Edinburgh Art Festival (2004)
 Edinburgh International Festival (1947)
 Edinburgh Festival Fringe (1947) 
 Royal Edinburgh Military Tattoo (1950)
 Just Festival (formerly the Festival of Spirituality and Peace) (2005)
 Edinburgh International Book Festival (1983)
 Edinburgh Mela (1995)
 Edinburgh International Television Festival (1976)
Fringe of Colour (2018)

October
 Leith Comedy Festival (2020)
 Africa in Motion (2006)
 Scottish International Storytelling Festival (1990)
 Festival of Politics (2005)
 Edinburgh Horror Festival (2016)

December
 Edinburgh's Hogmanay (1994)

Uncertain dates
 Edinburgh People's Festival (2002, but claims heritage from earlier festival of same name 1951–1954)

Defunct festivals
 Edinburgh Interactive Festival (2003)
 Edinburgh International Internet Festival (1999)
 Edinburgh Swing Festival (2006)
 Fringe Film Festival (1984 - 1990)
 Fringe Film & Video Festival (FFVF) (1991 - 1996)
 iFest (2007) — the Internet Festival and Conference
 West Port Book Festival (2008) – a free book festival involving secondhand bookshops in the West Port area

Notes and references

External links 

 Edinburgh Festival City
 Edinburgh Festivals a guide to the festivals that take place in Edinburgh which are members of Festivals Edinburgh
 EdinburghFestivalGuide.co.uk a comprehensive listing of all (small and large) Edinburgh festivals
 
 A History of the Edinburgh Festivals
 Edinburgh Festival Classroom resources
National Library of Scotland: SCOTTISH SCREEN ARCHIVE (selection of archive films about the Edinburgh Festival)

 
Arts festivals in Scotland
Annual events in Edinburgh
August events
Autumn events in Scotland